Pool D of the First Round of the 2017 World Baseball Classic was held at Estadio Charros de Jalisco, Zapopan, Mexico, from March 9 to 13, 2017, between Italy, Mexico, Puerto Rico, and Venezuela. Pool D was a round-robin tournament. Each team played the other three teams once, with the top two teams advancing to Pool F.

Puerto Rico advanced to the second round after winning all three of its matches. There was a three-way tie for second place, however, because Italy defeated Mexico, Venezuela defeated Italy, and Mexico defeated Venezuela. Per tournament rules, the best two teams would play a tiebreaker game to determine the pool runner-up. Venezuela defeated Italy, to advance to Pool F.

The first tiebreaker criterion is fewest runs allowed per defensive inning played in the games between the tied teams. Mexico allowed 19 runs, Italy allowed 20 runs, and Venezuela allowed 21 runs. Italy and Venezuela played 19 innings each in the two matches, therefore their RA/IPD were 1.053 and 1.105. Mexico played 18 innings, but they recorded no outs in the ninth inning of their game versus Italy, therefore the inning did not count towards their RA/IPD of 1.117.

Standings

Pool D MVP:  Francisco Lindor

Results
All times are Central Standard Time (UTC−06:00).

Italy 10, Mexico 9

Puerto Rico 11, Venezuela 0

Venezuela 11, Italy 10

Puerto Rico 9, Mexico 4

Puerto Rico 9, Italy 3

Mexico 11, Venezuela 9

Tiebreaker game − Venezuela 4, Italy 3

References

External links
Official website

Pool D
International baseball competitions hosted by Mexico
World Baseball Classic Pool D
Sport in Jalisco
Zapopan